Oak Hill, Virginia may refer to:
 Oak Hill, Albemarle County, Virginia
 Oak Hill, Fairfax County, Virginia
 Oak Hill, Page County, Virginia
 Oak Hill, Pittsylvania County, Virginia

See also

 Oak Hill (Annandale, Virginia), a Georgian style home built in 1790
 Oak Hill (Colonial Heights, Virginia), a building from 1825
 Oak Hill (Cumberland, Virginia), a Federal style building from 1810
 Oak Hill (Delaplane, Virginia), a private residence consisting of two separate houses connected by a passageway
 Oak Hill (James Monroe House), a mansion and plantation near Leesburg, Virginia
 Oak Hill, West Virginia, in part of the territory that seceded from Virginia during the U.S. Civil War to form West Virginia
 Oak Hill (disambiguation)